Peter Gatenby may refer to:

 Peter Gatenby (cricketer) (born 1949), Australian cricketer
Peter Gatenby (doctor) (1923–2015), Irish former doctor

See also
Gatenby (name)